Cita Hati Christian School is a Christian Private School founded in Surabaya, East Java, Indonesia, in 1990 by Magdalena Nugroho. The school originally consisted of the East and West Campuses, but in 2017 the Samarinda Campus was finished in Samarinda, Indonesia.

History 
The Buah Hati Christian Pre-School and Kindergarten were established by the Buah Hati Education Foundation in 1990. In 1994, the Cita Hati Christian Elementary School was founded in Pakuwon City in East Surabaya, which became known as the East Campus. Cita Hati Christian Junior High School was established in 2000, followed by Cita Hati Christian Senior High School in 2003. In 2004, the Cita Hati Christian Junior and Senior Schools moved to Pakuwon City next to the East Campus. In 2008, a pre-school, kindergarten, and elementary school were established in the western region of Surabaya, which then became known as the West Campus. In 2015, the Cita Hati Christian Senior School West Campus expanded to Bukit Golf. In 2017, the Samarinda Campus, consisting of a Elementary School and Junior High School, was finished in Samarinda.

Campuses 

 Cita Hati West Campus, Surabaya
 Cita Hati East Campus, Surabaya
 Cita Hati Samarinda Campus, Samarinda

References 

Buildings and structures in Surabaya
Schools in East Java
Christian schools in Indonesia
National Plus schools